Great Burdon is a village in the borough of Darlington and the ceremonial county of County Durham, England. It is situated to the north-east of Darlington.

References

External links

Villages in County Durham
Places in the Borough of Darlington
Places in the Tees Valley